The albums discography of Connie Smith, an American country artist, consists of 39 studio albums, one live album, 14 compilation albums, three box sets, and 26 other appearances. After the success of her 1964 single "Once a Day", Smith's self-titled debut album was released in March 1965 on RCA Victor Records. The album reached number one on the Billboard Top Country Albums, spending thirty weeks on the chart, while also becoming her only album to reach the Billboard 200 list (#105). Smith's next two secular albums, Cute 'n' Country and Miss Smith Goes to Nashville went to number one and number two respectively between 1965 and 1966. In September 1966 Smith released her fifth studio album, Born to Sing, which was her third album to reach the top spot on the Billboard country albums chart. Due to Smith's popularity, RCA Victor issued five albums between 1967 and 1968 including Downtown Country (1967), Connie Smith Sings Bill Anderson (1967), and I Love Charley Brown (1968). In 1969, Smith collaborated with country artist Nat Stuckey on the album Young Love.

In the early 70s, Smith released a series of albums including I Never Once Stopped Loving You (1970), Just One Time (1971), Ain't We Havin' Us a Good Time (1972), and If It Ain't Love and Other Great Dallas Frazier Songs. In addition, Smith released her third Gospel album in 1971 entitled Come Along and Walk with Me. After signing with Columbia Records in 1973, Smith released A Lady Named Smith, which peaked at #31 on the Billboard Top Country Albums chart. In 1974 she released the albums That's the Way Love Goes and I Never Knew (What That Song Meant Before), the latter of which went to #22 on the Billboard country albums chart. Before departing Columbia in 1977, Smith released three more studio releases including 1975's Connie Smith Sings Hank Williams Gospel and 1976's I Don't Wanna Talk It Over Anymore. In 1977 Smith moved to Monument Records where she recorded two albums. Taking a twenty-year break to raise her five children, Smith returned in 1998 with a self-titled album on Warner Bros. Records. In 2003 she collaborated with Barbara Fairchild and Sharon White on the Gospel album Love Never Fails. In August 2011, Smith released her thirty-sixth solo studio album on the Sugar Hill label entitled Long Line of Heartaches.

Studio albums

As lead artist

As a collaborative artist

Compilation albums

Live albums

Box sets

Other appearances

See also 
 Connie Smith singles discography
 List of years in country music

Notes

References

External links 
 Connie Smith — discography

Discographies of American artists
Country music discographies